The 1963 Miami Redskins football team was an American football team that represented Miami University during the 1963 NCAA University Division football season. In March 1963, following John Pont's resignation as head coach, Miami hired Bo Schembechler, who had played for the team from 1948 to 1950 and served as an assistant coach in 1955, as the new head football coach.

In their first season under Schembechler, Miami finished in second place in the Mid-American Conference (MAC), compiled a 5–3–2 record (4–1–1 against MAC opponents), and outscored all opponents by a combined total of 208 to 178.  Dave McClain joined Schembechler's staff as an assistant coach in 1963.

The team's statistical leaders included quarterback Ernie Kellermann with 895 passing yards, Tom Longsworth with 642 rushing yards, and Jack Himebauch with 226 receiving yards.

Three Miami players were selected as first-team players on the All-MAC team: quarterback Ernie Kellermann, fullback Tom Longsworth, and guard Dave Mallory. Longsworth and Mallory were the team captains and also shared the team's most valuable player honors.

Schedule

References

Miami
Miami RedHawks football seasons
Miami Redskins football